Redell Olsen FEA (born in 1971) is a British poet, performance artist, film-maker and academic. Her work incorporates traditional books alongside images, texts for performance, films, and site specific work. Olsen describes her work as involving avant-garde modernist and contemporary poetics, feminist theory and writing practice, Language Writing, ecology and environmental literatures, and performance.

Life and work

ACADEMIC CAREER

Olsen studied English literature at Cambridge University before subsequently completing an MA in Fine Art. She completed her PhD on 'Contemporary Poetics and Innovative Women's Writing' at Royal Holloway, University of London, in 2002, and went on to teach on the Performance Writing programme at Dartington University alongside Caroline Bergvall. She subsequently moved to a Lectureship at Royal Holloway, University of London, where she is now Professor in Poetry and Poetics, teaching undergraduate English Students and postgraduate Creative Writing students. With Robert Gavin Hampson, she founded and ran the MA in Poetic Practice at Royal Holloway from 2003-13. Starting in 2014 this was absorbed into the MA Creative Writing programme as the Poetic Practice Pathway (alongside the existing Poetry and Fiction pathways). 
The courses on this pathway were taught for many years by Olsen, Hampson, and Will Montgomery; it is now taught mainly by Olsen. She is also currently the Director of the Poetics Research Centre at Royal Holloway.

AWARDS

Olsen was the Judith E. Wilson Fellow at the University of Cambridge from 2013-14. During this period she produced 'Whiteout Film for Snowgoggles' as part of the Polar Muse project at the Scott Polar Research institute in Cambridge. In 2018, her poetic film essay 'Now Circa (1918)' was shortlisted for the AHRC Research in Film Award. More recently, she was the winner of the 2020-21 DARE Art Prize. This was awarded by the University of Leeds  and Opera North in association with the National Science and Media Museum and The Tetley, Leeds for the creation of a film and a song cycle, using and responding to scientific data measuring different species of insects in the UK skies. This practice-based research will contribute to the inter-disciplinary research into climate change and species extinction of the University of Leeds BIODAR unit. She was elected a Fellow of the English Association in 2020.

WORK

Olsen's early work includes 'Book of the Insect' (allsingingalldancing, 1999) and 'Book of the Fur' (rempress, 2000). In 2004, she and the book-artist Susan Johanknecht published here are my instructions (Gefn Press), the outcome of their collaborative project 'writing instructions / reading walls', which had involved inviting 9 artists/writers to present them with instructions for a work to be sited on the cafe wall at the Poetry Society, London. These works were exhibited serially over the period January to May 2003. Olsen and Johanknecht then sent their own instructions to the 9 participants in response to the work produced. Here are my instructions includes this second response together with visual material relating to the work produced in response to the first set on instructions. It also included a foreword by the two editors and a poem by Olsen, 'we await your instructions nervously'.

In 2004, Olsen also published secure portable space (Reality Street). This included four sequences: 'Corrupted by Showgirls'; Spill-Kit; Era of Heroes; and The Minimaus Poems - her response to Charles Olson's Maximus. David Kennedy and Christine Kennedy, in their book, women's experimental poetry in britain 1970 to 2010 (2013), described 'Corrupted by Showgirls' as 'a gender-politics savvy critique of the representation of women in musicals and film noir' (143). They noted, in particular, how the sequence picks up on 'film's reliance on close-ups of small, but telling, physical gestures for its most powerful emotional effects' (143). Their suggestion that 'Era of heroes / Heroes of Error' shows Olsen's interest in 'public language and public space' (143) is developed more fully by Zoe Skoulding in her monograph Contemporary Women's Poetry & Urban Space (2013). Skoulding discusses how Olsen's 'The Minimaus Poems' read 'the spatial environment of the city' against 'the textual background of Charles Olson's The Maximus Poems''' (179). Rather than being a simple play on the similar surnames, carried over into an ironic juxtaposition of Gloucester, England, and Gloucester, Massachusetts, Olsen's text sets up 'a complex interplay in which location and gender shift within multiple ironies' (180): Olsen's text works to disrupt 'any certainty' by creating 'a double map in which competing views multiply subject positions, disturbing the relationship with the background text by foregrounding particular elements of it' (181). Olsen complicates this further by reworking the American Gloucester through the writings of the composer and First World War poet, Ivor Gurney (Olsen, 2004). In addition, Olsen's subject is enmeshed in the environment created by contemporary technological communication systems (181). Skoulding also discusses Olsen's neon-light version of 'Era of Heroes / Heroes of Error', displayed in the bookart bookshop in Old Street, London, where the flickering of the light repeatedly collapsed the words 'Era of Heroes' into 'Heroes of Error'as 'a challenge to the notion of the hero in a time of war'. The long alphabetical list of superheroes, 'perhaps reminiscent of the reading out of the names of the dead', which Olsen read to accompany the exhibition, Skoulding suggests,'quotes popular culture while drawing attention to the arbitrary construction of notions of heroism' (183).

Two of Olsen's most important formative volumes were published in the USA. In 2012, she published Punk Faun: A Bar Rock Pastel (Oakland, CA: Subpress), and, in 2014, she published film poems (Los Angeles: Les Figues). Film poems brought together 5 sequences: London Land Marks; A Newe Book of Copyes; Bucolic Picnic; The Lost Pool; and SPRIGS & spots. All five were originally written in conjunction with films made or re-made by Olsen, as Drew Milne points out in his foreword. An account of the making and performance of 'The Lost Pool' is contained in Robert Hampson's essay, 'Lost and Found: Women's Poetry and the Academy' (Journal of British and Irish Innovative Poetry, 3:2, September 2011, 81-90). Sophie Mayer discusses Olsen's film poems in 'Cinema Mon Amour: How British Poetry Fell in Love with Film', her chapter in The Oxford Handbook of Contemporary British and Irish Poetry (OUP, 2013).  Olsen provided her own engagement with the aesthetics of the film poems in 'To Quill at Film' published in Trenchart: Logistics (Los Angeles: Les Figues, 2013). As noted above, Olsen's poetic film essay 'Now Circa (1918), produced to mark the centenary of suffrage for some women in Great Britain in the contemporary context of Trump and #MeToo, was shortlisted for the AHRC research in Film Award (2018). More recently, she produced a text for film and live performance 'Judgement Action' (or 'Foil, Jumping, Daisies), which draws on research into Black Mountain College. Olsen discusses her engagement with film in an interview for the midnight mollusc.

Her most recent work is weather, whether radar: plume of the volants, published by ethical midge / electric crinolines in September 2021. This substantial volume consists of series of visual and textual works that were produced, as a result of the DARE Prize, through conversations and collaborations with the BioDar research team at the University of Leeds, Opera North, and in association with the National Science and Media Museum and the Tetley Art Gallery. It explores the possibilities of a poetic, creative-critical and visual engagement with the BioDar research team's rereading of weather-data collected by the UK's extensive weather radar network. This archive of data, collected to record weather, accidentally also mapped insect life. This aspect of the archive, which was regarded by the meteorologists as 'noise', has proved to be an invaluable record of insect diversity and abundance for the BioDar group. Olsen's poetic and art-led practice explores how to engage with scientific data (and cross-disciplinary academic expertise drawn from the fields of biology, ecology, physics and atmospheric science) and how to frame related ecological, historical and cultural concerns. At the same time, the poetic and artistic project has been open to contexts beyond the laboratory, responsive to contemporary events. Like the BioDar research, weather, whether radar has also been concerned to repurpose a technology originally developed for warfare for alternative purposes - in this case, a concern with climate change and environmental degradation.

Olsen's critical work also includes: 'Strategies of Critical Practice: Recent Writing on Experimental  and Innovative Poetry by Women' (Signs, 33:2, Winter 2008, 373-87); 'Degrees of Liveness, Live and Electronic Subjects: Leslie Scalapino, Fiona Templeton and Carla Harryman', How2, I.6; 'Kites and Poses: Attitudinal Interfaces in Frank O'Hara and Grace Hartigan' in Robert Hampson and Will Montgomery (eds), Frank O'Hara Now (Liverpool University Press, 2010), 178-94; 'Field Recording as Writing: John Berger, Peter Gizzi and Julian Spahr in Will Montgomery and Stephen Benson (eds), Writing the Field Recording (Edinburgh, 2018) 167-86.

Between 2006 and 2010 Olsen was the editor of the online journal How(2).  For a number of years, she ran POLYply with Will Montgomery and Kristen Kreider, a cross-media and intermedia performance series, that incorporated poetry, art, music, and film. She continues to be co-curator of the Institute of Electric Crinolines.

 Books of Poetry  

 weather, whether radar: plume of the volants (ethical midge, electric crinolines, 2021)
 Film Poems (Les Figues, 2014)
 Punk Faun: A Bar Rock Pastel (Subpress, 2012)
 Secure Portable Space (Reality Street, 2004)
 Here are My Instructions [with Susan Johanknecht] (Gefn Press, 2004)
 Star Furnishing (Toiling Elves, 2004)
 Attention (Lounge, 2003)
 unmarkedforsearch (allsingingalldancing, 2001)
 Book of The Fur (Rem Press, 2000)
 Book of the Insect (allsingingalldancing, 1999)
 Quid Pro Quo (allsingingallDancing, 1998)

 Further reading 
 Marcella Durand, Necessary Space: a review of secure portable space in Jacket Allen Fisher, "Minimaus: in response to cultural malaise" in Pores Redell Olsen, "Images After Errors/Errors After Images: Joan Retallack"
 Redell Olsen, "Postmodern poetry in Britain" in The Cambridge Companion to Twentieth-Century English Poetry, ed. Neil Corcoran (2008)
Will Rowe in conversation with Redell Olsen in Pores Lucy Sheerman in conversation with Redell Olsen in How(2) David Kennedy and Christine Kennedy, women's experimental poetry in britain 1970-2010 (Liverpool University Press, 2013), 142-44.
 Zoe Skoulding, Contemporary Women's Poetry & Urban Space (Palgrave Macmillan, 2013), 179-84.
 Robert Hampson, 'An expanded poetic practice: Some Contemporary Innovative Women Poets', Years Work in English Studies'' (2021).

See also

 British Poetry Revival

References

English women poets
1971 births
Living people